Xolile Yawa (born 29 September 1962 in Lady Frere, Eastern Cape) is a retired athlete from South Africa - ZA. He specialised in long-distance running, including marathons.

He is best known as the winner of 1993 Berlin Marathon. At the 1992 Summer Olympics, he was 13th at men's 10,000 metres. He also represented South Africa at the 1996 Summer Olympics. At the 1992 African Championships in Athletics, he won Bronze at 10000 metres.

At the South African national championships, he won the 10,000 metres track event nine times (1985–1990, 1992, 1994, 1996) and Half marathon twice (1986 and 1988).

Achievements

References

External links
sports-reference

1962 births
Living people
South African male long-distance runners
South African male marathon runners
Olympic athletes of South Africa
Athletes (track and field) at the 1992 Summer Olympics
Athletes (track and field) at the 1996 Summer Olympics
Berlin Marathon male winners